Tisbury Great Pond is a salt pond in the town of West Tisbury, Massachusetts and oyster restoration site.

References 

Ponds of Massachusetts
Martha's Vineyard
West Tisbury, Massachusetts